Damiano Binetti, (born in 1968) is an Italian conductor, composer and tenor based in Prague and Malta. He is the artistic director of the Prague Madrigalists, the chamber ensemble within the Czech Philharmonic, and also the artistic director for the Theatre of Silesia in Opava in the Czech Republic.  Binetti was also the principal conductor and music director of the Prague Mozart Chamber Orchestra, a position held until 2006.

References

External links

Italian male conductors (music)
1968 births
Living people
21st-century Italian conductors (music)
21st-century Italian male musicians